Mister Terrific may refer to:

Mr. Terrific (TV series), a 1967 US television sitcom
"Mister Terrific", a third-season episode of the Golden Girls
Mister Terrific (comics) is the name of two different superheroes in the DC Comics universe
Mister Terrific (Terry Sloane)
Mister Terrific (Michael Holt)